West Bengal Lokayukta is the Parliamentary Ombudsman for the state of West Bengal (India). It is a high level statutory functionary,  created to address grievances of the public against ministers, legislators, administration and public servants in issues related to misuse of power, mal-administration and corruption. It was first formed under the West Bengal Lokayukta and Upa-Lokayukta Act and approved by the president of India on 2013. The passage of Lokpal and Lokayukta's Act,2013 in Parliament had become law from January 16, 2014, and requires each state to appoint its Lokayukta within a year.  A bench of Lokayukta should consist of judicial and non-judicial members. An Upa-Lokayukta is a deputy to Lokayukta and assists him in his work and acts in-charge Lokayukta in case the position falls vacant before time.

A Lokayukta of the state is appointed to office by the state Governor after consulting the committee consisting of State Chief Minister, Speaker of Legislative Assembly, Leader of Opposition, Chairman of Legislative Council and Leader of Opposition of Legislative Council and cannot be removed from office except for reasons specified in the Act and will serve the period of five years.

History and Administration 

West Bengal Lokayukta and Upa-Lokayukta was approved by its Legislative Assembly in 2003. The state Lokayukta had been approved in years 2004,2007 and 2018 for

 Investigation against members referred as “public servants" in the Act, needs the permission of the State Government.
 State Parliamentary Affairs minister had been included in the committee formed for the selection of new Lokayukta
 inclusion of High Court judge as eligibility for Lokayukta in addition to “potential Supreme Court judge".
 Removal of Upa-Lokayukta position.

In the year 2018, the Act had been amended to keep the Chief Minister out of the purview of Lokayukta except in special cases after approval from State Legislature with two-third members present and voting in its favour. As per the Act, for initiating inquiry against any sitting member of Legislature Assembly permission from Assembly Speaker is needed.

Oath or affirmation

Powers 

Lokayukta has independent powers to investigate and prosecute any government official or public servants, who are covered by the act and against whom the complaint is received for abusing his authority for self interest or causes hurt to anyone or any action done intentionally or following corrupt practices negatively impacting the state or individual. However, the state Chief Minister is exempted from the Act in issues relating to Governance, nominations for police officials and bureaucratic staff. The State Chief Minister is covered for 58 subjects of the State List after getting two-thirds majority approval from members present and voting for it in Legislature Assembly. Once a complaint is received on allegations of corruption, wrong use of authority and misdeeds by any of public functionaries who may include any ministers in the Government and members of Legislature Assembly, Lokayukta has the power to recommend enquiry to necessary authorities and prosecute, if proven.

Appointments relating to state police, deployment of security forces in the state and any other emergency situations specified in the Act are regarded as public order.

Appointment and Tenure 

The first Lokayukta of the state was a retired Calcutta high court judge, Samaresh Bandyopadhyay, from the year 2006 to 2009.

In year 2018, Hon'ble Ashim Kumar Roy, Retired Calcutta High Court judge, was appointed as the State Lokayukta and will serve a period of 3 years.

See also 

 The Lokpal and Lokayuktas Act, 2013
 Goa Lokayukta
 Karnataka Lokayukta
 Delhi Lokayukta
 Himachal Pradesh Lokayukta

References

External links 
 official website

Anti-corruption measures in India
Lokayuktas